Inflanty is the Polish name for Livonia and may refer to the following historical jurisdictions :
 Inflanty Voivodeship
 Duchy of Livonia
 Roman Catholic Diocese of Inflanty, a territorial division of the Roman Catholic Church established in 1186